Herbert L. "Bud" Koper (born August 9, 1942) is an American former National Basketball Association (NBA) player. In his senior season at Oklahoma City University, Bud scored a school-record fifty points against North Texas State. Following the season, he was named a first team All-American by the USBWA and was invited to the U.S. Olympic tryouts. Bud was drafted with the seventh pick in the second round of the 1964 NBA Draft by the San Francisco Warriors. He played in one NBA season for the Warriors, averaging 4.6 points, 1.1 rebounds, and 0.8 assists per game.

References

1942 births
Living people
All-American college men's basketball players
American men's basketball players
Basketball players from Oklahoma
Oklahoma City Stars men's basketball players
San Francisco Warriors draft picks
San Francisco Warriors players
Shooting guards